Grain is a Canadian literary magazine featuring poetry, short fiction, non-fiction, and artwork. It is published quarterly by the Saskatchewan Writers' Guild and is based in Saskatoon, Saskatchewan.

History
Grain published its first issue in June 1973, a gestetner edition with stapled, taped bindings, and with cover art on a card-stock cover by a then new artist Joe Fafard. The first edition, edited by Ken Mitchell, Anne Szumigalski, and Caroline Heath included writings by Robert Kroetsch, George Bowering, Robert Currie, and John V. Hicks, and cost $1.00. A subscription cost $2 a year, or $5 for three years. This was the first of a series of semi-annual issues. In 1976, Grain began publishing three issues a year, and then in 1981, moved to its present quarterly - four issues a year - state. Over the years it has published many prominent poets and authors from Canada and abroad. Overall, approximately 3,000 pieces of writing and over 500 art images have been published.

Short Grain Contest
The first Short Grain contest was announced in 1988. The contest would accept submissions in two categories: Postcard Stories: Narrative fiction under 500 words; and Prose Poem: A lyric poem written as a prose paragraph or paragraphs in 500 words or less. A total of 1000$ in awards was offered over 1st, 2nd, and 3rd places in both categories. This first award was sponsored by M. C. Graphics, the printer of Grain.

In 1991 Houghton Boston Printers took over printing of Grain magazine. This year also marked a change in Short Grain sponsorship. Cheryl and Henry Kloppenburg, Barristers and Solicitors of Saskatoon, began sponsoring the Short Grain contest, which they continue to do.

This contest now awards $4,500 in prizes annually between the categories of Poetry and Fiction/Creative Non-Fiction.

Editors
Grain has had 11 editors in its 40-year history:
 Ken Mitchell
 Caroline Heath
 E.F. Dyck
 Brenda Riches
 Mick Burrs
 Geoffrey Ursell
 J. Jill Robinson
 Elizabeth Philips
 Kent Bruyneel
 Sylvia Legris
 Rilla Friesen

Notable contributors
Grain has featured many renowned and award-winning writers including:
 Ken Babstock
 Roo Borson
 George Bowering
 Lorna Crozier
 Jeramy Dodds
 Connie Gault
 John V. Hicks
 Richard Holeton
 Barbara Klar
 Robert Kroetsch
 Patrick Lane
 Tim Lilburn
 Yann Martel
 Don McKay
 A. F. Moritz
 Al Purdy
 Anne Simpson
 Karen Solie
 Moez Surani
 Guy Vanderhaeghe
 Jan Zwicky

See also
List of literary magazines

References

External links
 
 Saskatchewan Writers' Guild

1973 establishments in Canada
Literary magazines published in Canada
Quarterly magazines published in Canada
Magazines established in 1973
Magazines published in Saskatchewan